The Bureya Dam (locally referred to as Bureyskaya) is a hydroelectric dam on the Bureya River in the Russian Far East.

History
Bureya hydroelectric power station was built by Bureyagesstroy.  Construction started in 1976, but was halted until 1999.  In 1999, RAO UES restarted the project.  The dam was completed and the first unit was launched in 2003.  The construction of the whole complex was completed in 2009.

The reservoir reached its specified level during the summer-autumn monsoon season of 2009. It was accompanied with first use of spillways during planned tests. Despite the fact that all primary construction works on power station was completed, it was officially commenced for exploitation by government commission in 2011. Therefore, officially, the complex is still under construction.

Description

The facility is owned by RusHydro.

See also 

 List of conventional hydroelectric power stations
 List of power stations in Russia

External links

References

Dams in Russia
Hydroelectric power stations in Russia
Buildings and structures in the Russian Far East
Energy in the Russian Far East
Buildings and structures in Amur Oblast
Dams completed in 2009